is a train station in Mine, Yamaguchi Prefecture, Japan. The station previously served the closed Ōmine Branch Line.

Lines 
West Japan Railway Company
Mine Line

Railway stations in Japan opened in 1905
Railway stations in Yamaguchi Prefecture